Progressistas (PP) is a centre-right to right-wing political party in Brazil. Founded in 1995 as the Brazilian Progressive Party, it emerged from parties that were successors to ARENA, the ruling party of the Brazilian military dictatorship. A pragmatist party, it supported the governments of presidents Fernando Henrique Cardoso, Luiz Inácio Lula da Silva, Dilma Rousseff, and Michel Temer. Largely it was the party of the politics of Paulo Maluf, a former governor and mayor of São Paulo. Of all political parties, in corruption investigation Operation Car Wash, the Progressistas had the most convictions.

The party in recent years had fully embraced the right. In the 2018 Brazilian general election, the party supported the candidacy of Geraldo Alckmin. After the election, although they remained neutral in the second round, the party has almost fully supported the policies of Jair Bolsonaro, supporting his candidacy for president in 2022 and voting with him 93% of the time.

History 

Founded in 1995, as Brazilian Progressive Party (PPB), by the union of:
the Reform Progressive Party, founded in 1993 by Democratic Social Party and Christian Democratic Party;
the Progressive Party, founded in 1993 by the Social Labour Party and the Reform Labour Party.

The party entered in coalition with the Brazilian Social Democracy Party and the Liberal Front Party, supporting President Fernando Henrique Cardoso in the 1998 Brazilian general election.

In the 2002 general election, the party informally supported the candidacy of Ciro Gomes in the first round and formally supported José Serra in the second round.

In 2003 the party re-changed its name to the Progressive Party. PP has also supported the Workers' Party-led government from 2003 to 2015.

At the parliamentary elections, held in October 2006, the party won 42 of the 513 seats in the chamber of deputies, and it has 1 of the 81 seats in the Senate. At the 2010 elections, PP won 41 seats in the Chamber of Deputies, and made gains in the Senate for a total of 5 seats. It lost an extremely close gubernatorial runoff in Roraima to the PSDB, and won no state governorships.

In the 2010 elections , alliances between moderate and left-leaning parties took place in several places, such as in Bahia, where the PP was part of the PT candidate's coalition, having even nominated its vice governor.  About this type of coalition, the former mayor of São Paulo and former PT member Luísa Erundina declared, still in May 2010, that "It is sad, agonizing to see Maluf's PP with PCdoB. It's all the same." 

Its most well-known politicians are Paulo Maluf, mayor and governor of São Paulo for several terms, Esperidião Amin, former governor of Santa Catarina and senator, and Francisco Dornelles, former minister of Labour and senator for the state of Rio de Janeiro.

The party has from its very beginning shown a tendency for regional division, with the section from Rio Grande do Sul state often threatening with secession, in part due to what is viewed by them as condescendence of the party's national direction towards members involved in corruption scandals, including Paulo Maluf (who has recently been discharged from his post as de facto leader of PP). The national orientation of the party has been one of close alliance with Lula's Workers' Party government (except on issues sensitive to the right wing core of PP, such as taxes), while the section of Rio Grande do Sul once more show a defiant stance in aligning itself more often with the opposition.

The Progressive Party supported the impeachment of Dilma Rousseff, splitting its alliance with the Worker's Party.

This party was most affected by the Petrobras corruption scandal, damaging its national popularity.

The party supported the candidacy of Geraldo Alckmin in 2018, but did not endorse a candidate in the second round.

After the election, the party joined a coalition with the Republicanos and the Liberal Party to support Jair Bolsonaro in government.

Ideology 

The party has traditionally been, like many right-wing parties in Brazil, one of pragmatism and moderation, largely allying with larger left-wing parties. The party's main positions in Congress have been that of business interests supporting lower taxation, highlighing those proposals in accordance with other economic growth principles of the left. When allied with the governments of Lula and Dilma, the party supported the Bolsa Familia program in confluence with tax cuts for economic growth.

In more recent years however, the party has become more stridently national conservative, representing the less religious and less populist conservatism that existed in Brazil before the election of Bolsonaro. The party supported greater economic nationalism than some of its coalition partners and is generally less in support of the military than the Liberal Party. However, in general, the party supports Bolsonarismo, and many of his cabinet members are members or have joined the party.

Notable Members 
 Esperidião Amin, former mayor of Florianópolis and former Federal Deputy, former Governor, and Senator of Santa Catarina
 Roberto Campos, former Minister of planning for the military dictatorship and senator for Mato Grosso
 Severino Cavalcanti, former President of the Chamber of Deputies and deputy for Pernambuco
 Tereza Cristina, former Federal Deputy for Mato Grasso do Sul and former Minister of Agriculture
 Luis Carlos Heinze, Senator and former Federal Deputy for Rio Grande do Sul
 Paulo Maluf, a former Governor and Mayor of São Paulo
 Ciro Nogueira, former Chief of Staff of the Presidency, Senator from Piauí, and National President of the Progressistas

Electoral history

Legislative elections

References

Conservative parties in Brazil
Political parties established in 1995
1995 establishments in Brazil